Pryadchino is a rural locality (a selo) in Novopetrovsky Selsoviet of Blagoveshchensky District, Amur Oblast, Russia. The population was 181 as of 2018. There are 8 streets.

Geography 
Pryadchino is located 80 km north of Blagoveshchensk (the district's administrative centre) by road. Novopetrovka is the nearest rural locality.

References 

Rural localities in Blagoveshchensky District, Amur Oblast